Ludwig von Hofmann (17 August 1861 – 23 August 1945) was a German painter, graphic artist and designer. He worked in a combination of the Art Nouveau and Symbolist styles. His work was part of the painting event in the art competition at the 1928 Summer Olympics.

Biography 
He was born in Darmstadt. His father was the Prussian statesman Karl von Hofmann, who served as Minister-president of the Grand Duchy of Hesse from 1872 to 1876 and was briefly Trade Minister in the cabinet of Otto von Bismarck.

Ludwig began his studies in 1883 at the Dresden Academy of Fine Arts, then studied with Ferdinand Keller at the Academy of Fine Arts, Karlsruhe. In 1889, he attended the Académie Julian in Paris, where he came under the influence of Pierre Puvis de Chavannes and Paul-Albert Besnard.

After 1890, he was a freelance painter in Berlin. From 1894 to 1900, he travelled extensively and spent a great deal of his time at his villa in Fiesole. His appreciation of antiquity and attraction to the idea of Arcadia permeates much of his work. After 1895, he was a regular contributor of illustrations for the Art Nouveau magazine Pan. In 1896, he became a member of the Berlin Secession and he was married in 1899. He was also a member of the Deutscher Künstlerbund

In 1903, he was appointed a Professor at the Weimar Saxon Grand Ducal Art School, where he became a member of the avant-garde literary and artistic group centered around Harry Graf Kessler. Jean Arp and Ivo Hauptmann were among his students. In 1916, he was named a Professor at the Academy in Dresden, where he remained until 1931. He also provided illustrations for a new translation of the Odyssey by Leopold Ziegler and works by Gerhart Hauptmann (Ivo's father).

His overall production slackened in the 1930s and, in 1937, some of his works were labeled as "degenerate art". He retired to Pillnitz, near Dresden, where he died in 1945. His remaining works were almost confiscated by the Russians after the war, but his widow managed to save them.

Selected paintings

References

Further reading
 Herta Hesse-Frielinghaus (Ed.): Gerhart Hauptmann – Ludwig von Hofmann. Briefwechsel 1894–1944. Bouvier, Bonn 1983, 
 Verena Senti-Schmidlin: Der Tanz als Bildmotiv. Ludwig von Hofmann 1861–1945. Lang, Bern u. a. 1999, 
 Contessa Roberts: Auf der Suche „nach dem entschwebten Land der Griechen“. Der Maler und Graphiker Ludwig von Hofmann (1861–1945). Ein Überblick über sein Œuvre mit besonderem Schwerpunkt auf Zeichnungen und Druckgraphik. Dissertation, University of Freiburg 2001 (Online)
 Verena Senti-Schmidlin: Rhythmus und Tanz in der Malerei. Zur Bewegungsästhetik im Werk von Ferdinand Hodler und Ludwig von Hofmann. Olms, Hildesheim 2007, 
 Annette Wagner, Klaus Wolbert (Eds.): Ludwig von Hofmann (1861–1945). Arkadische Utopien in der Moderne. Stadt Darmstadt, Darmstadt 2005, 
 Städtische Sammlungen Freital, Schloss Burgk: Ludwig von Hofmann: Sehnsucht nach dem Paradies Sandstein Verlag, Dresden 2011,

External links 

 ArtNet: More works by Von Hofmann.
 
 Galerie Saxonia: Ludwig von Hofmann
 Ludwig-von-Hofmann Archiv
 

19th-century German painters
19th-century German male artists
German male painters
20th-century German painters
20th-century German male artists
1861 births
1945 deaths
Art Nouveau painters
German Symbolist painters
German erotic artists
Académie Julian
Artists from Darmstadt
Art Nouveau designers
Olympic competitors in art competitions